Henrique Valmir da Conceição (born 13 September 1959), better known as just China, is a Brazilian footballer. He played in five matches for the Brazil national football team in 1983. He was also part of Brazil's squad for the 1983 Copa América tournament.

References

External links
 

1959 births
Living people
Brazilian footballers
Brazil international footballers
Association football midfielders
Sportspeople from Rio Grande do Sul